Suphisellus remator is a species of burrowing water beetle in the subfamily Noterinae.  It was described by Sharp in 1882 and is found in Argentina, Bolivia, Brazil, Chile, Paraguay and Uruguay.

References

beetles described in 1882
Suphisellus